José Carlos de Araújo Nunes (born 7 March 1977) is a Portuguese former footballer who played as a centre back.

He amassed Primeira Liga totals of 129 games and two goals over five seasons, representing Salgueiros, Gil Vicente and Braga. He spent most of his professional career, however, with Mallorca in Spain, signing in 2006 and appearing in 258 official matches in eight La Liga campaigns.

Club career
Born in Castelo de Paiva, Aveiro District, Nunes began his professional career with modest clubs in the second and third divisions. He made his Primeira Liga debut in the 2001–02 season, with soon-to-be-extinct S.C. Salgueiros.

After two solid seasons with Gil Vicente FC, Nunes signed with fellow league side S.C. Braga in July 2004, moving in January 2006 to Spain's La Liga with RCD Mallorca. He made his debut for his new team on the 29th, starting in a 0–3 home loss to FC Barcelona and adding four league goals in his first full campaign in the Balearic Islands.

An undisputed starter from his arrival – he was also awarded captaincy early on– Nunes continued to figure prominently in 2009–10 as Mallorca won their first ten home league games of the season, with the player scoring twice, although one of those came in the 4–2 defeat at Barcelona. Eventually, he netted four times in 34 matches, and the club achieved a fifth place in the table (fourth until the last minute of the last round).

Nunes suffered a serious knee injury in a friendly with S.S.C. Napoli in mid-August 2011, initially being sidelined for seven months but recovering in less than four. He still contributed two goals in 14 appearances during the campaign, to help Mallorca finish eighth.

References

External links

1977 births
Living people
People from Castelo de Paiva
Sportspeople from Aveiro District
Portuguese footballers
Association football defenders
Primeira Liga players
Liga Portugal 2 players
Segunda Divisão players
A.D. Ovarense players
F.C. Maia players
S.C. Salgueiros players
Gil Vicente F.C. players
S.C. Braga players
La Liga players
Segunda División players
RCD Mallorca players
Portugal youth international footballers
Portuguese expatriate footballers
Expatriate footballers in Spain
Portuguese expatriate sportspeople in Spain